Jasová is a village and municipality in the Nové Zámky District in the Nitra Region of south-west Slovakia.

Etymology
Slovak jaz (dialect) - a weir but also a fish trap (from Proto-Slavic jazъ).

History
The village was first mentioned in 1434 (Tykeresnyek aliter Jaszafalu).

Geography
The municipality lies at an altitude of 167 metres and covers an area of 19.925 km². It has a population of about 1195 people.

Ethnicity
The population proportion is about 97% Slovak and 3% Hungarian.

Facilities
The village has a small public library, a gym and football pitch.

Genealogical resources

The records for genealogical research are available at the state archive "Statny Archiv in Nitra, Slovakia"

 Roman Catholic church records (births/marriages/deaths): 1762-1896 (parish A)
 Reformated church records (births/marriages/deaths): 1815-1945 (parish B)

See also
 List of municipalities and towns in Slovakia

References

External links

 https://web.archive.org/web/20070513023228/http://www.statistics.sk/mosmis/eng/run.html
 Jasová – Nové Zámky Okolie
 Surnames of living people in Jasova

Villages and municipalities in Nové Zámky District